Water tunnel may refer to:

 Water tunnel (physical infrastructure), a tunnel used to transport water, typically underground
 Qanat water management system
 Water tunnel (hydrodynamic), an experimental facility used for testing the hydrodynamic behavior of submerged bodies in flowing water, similar to a wind tunnel

See also
 Water (disambiguation)
 Tunnel (disambiguation)